Muslim Magomedovich Khuchiev (Russian: Мусли́м Магоме́дович Хучи́ев; born 5 August 1971) is a Russian politician, serving as the Prime Minister of the Chechen Republic since 25 June 2018.  

Khuchiev acted as Head of the Chechen Republic from 11-16 February 2019 and 13-21 January 2020.

Biography 
Khuchiev was born 5 August 1971 in Zakan-Yurt, Checheno-Ingush Autonomous Soviet Socialist Republic.

Education 
Between 1988 and 1991, Khuchiev studied at the Chechen State University in Grozny. In 1991, he transferred to the Faculty of Journalism, Lomonosov Moscow State University, graduating in 1994 with a degree in journalism. 

In 2009, Khuchiev graduated from the Russian Academy of Public Administration with a degree in public and municipal administration. 

In 2018, Khuchiev graduated from the Russian Presidential Academy of National Economy and Public Administration with a master's degree in economics.

Journalism and commerce 
Khuchiev first worked as a journalist in Moscow between 1995 and 1997, as a correspondent for the Screen of Criminal Reports programme of the Russian Television and Radio Broadcasting Network. 

From May 1998 to June 2004, he was an advertising manager at a manufacturing enterprise called Sokol RS LLC (Moscow).

State service 
From July 2004 to December 2005, Khuchiev served as Head of the Press Service of the President of the Chechen Republic, before becoming First Deputy Chief of Staff to the President of Chechnya in March 2006. 

From 7 March 2007 to 1 January 2010, Khuchiev served as Head of the Administration of Grozny, the Chechen capital, before serving as the city's mayor from 1 January 2010 to 8 October 2012. Khuchiev served as the Mayor of Grozny again from 11 August 2015  to 25 June 2018. 

Since 25 June 2018, Khuchiev has served as Chairman of the Government of the Chechen Republic - the Prime Minister of the Chechen Republic.

Khuchiev has acted as Head of the Chechen Republic twice - 11-16 February 2019 and 13-21 January 2020 - during the absences of Ramzan Kadyrov.

References 

1971 births
Living people
Prime Ministers of Chechnya
Moscow State University alumni
Russian Presidential Academy of National Economy and Public Administration alumni